Fiorillo is an Italian surname, and may refer to:

People
Carl Ferdinand Wilhelm Antonio Fiorillo (1758 - ?), Italian dancer and choreographer (?), son of Ignazio Fiorillo
Elisa Fiorillo (born 1969), American singer
Federigo Fiorillo (1755 - 1823), musician, composer, son of Ignazio Fiorillo
Ignazio Fiorillo (1715 - 1787), Italian composer of opera seria
Johann Dominicus Fiorillo  (1748 – 1821), German painter, son of Ignazio Fiorillo
Luigi Fiorillo  (1847–1898), Italian photographer, active in the Middle East and parts of Africa
Vincenzo Fiorillo (born 1990), Italian footballer